John Higham is the name of

 John Higham (Australian politician) (1856–1927), Western Australian Legislative Assembly Member
 John Higham (historian) (1920–2003), American historian
 John Higham (athlete) (born 1951), Australian middle-distance runner and sprinter
 John Sharp Higham (1857-1932), British politician